Suensaari is a Finnish peninsula in the river Torne. Although the 6 km2 peninsula is linked to Sweden, it was decided in 1809 that it would become Finnish. It has 2227 inhabitants as of 2012.

References 

Peninsulas of Finland